St. Vital Shopping Centre is a retail shopping mall located at 1225 St. Mary's Road, in Winnipeg, Manitoba, Canada.

History 
It opened with Eaton's, The Bay, and Woolco as anchor tenants. The mall was renovated in 1986, 1998, and 2013.

The building has six anchor tenants and 160 smaller stores, and has a gross leasable area of  including the freestanding Co-op grocery store, CIBC, Montana's Cookhouse, McDonald's, Old Navy, and Earls.  St. Vital Centre is owned by the Ontario Pension Board and was previously managed by 20 VIC Management Inc. to 2017 and Cushman & Wakefield Asset Services ULC to December 2020. Management of St. Vital Centre is now done by BentallGreenOak (Canada) LP.

The mall has 4,661 parking spaces, as well as a city transit bus depot positioned close to an entrance. As of 2001, the mall serves approximately 53,825 households within a 5 kilometre radius, with an average household income of $56,925. The location sees approximately 178,000 pedestrians per week.

The mall recycles plastics and aluminum in their food court, and paper in their offices, and recycles  of cardboard every year.

In 2012, the mall underwent a $10 million renovation, which was completed in November 2012. The renovation included new flooring, ceilings, wall coverings and energy efficient lighting.

Current anchor tenants
 Hudson's Bay 
 Chapters 
 London Drugs 
 Silver City 
 Sport Chek 
 Walmart Supercentre

External links
 St. Vital Shopping Centre

References

Buildings and structures in Winnipeg
Shopping malls in Manitoba
Eaton's
Shopping malls established in 1979
Centre